The Korean Tea Ceremony or darye (茶禮) is a traditional form of tea ceremony practiced in Korea. Darye literally refers to "etiquette for tea" or "tea rite" and has been kept among Korean people for over a thousand years. The chief element of the Korean tea ceremony is the ease and naturalness of enjoying tea within an easy formal setting.

Tea ceremonies are now being revived in Korea as a way to find relaxation and harmony in the fast-paced new Korean culture, and continuing in the long tradition of intangible Korean art.

History

Early history 
The first historical record documenting the offering of tea to an ancestral god describes a rite in the year 661 in which a tea offering was made to the spirit of King Suro, the founder of the Geumgwan Gaya Kingdom (42–562). Records from the Goryeo Dynasty (918–1392) show that tea offerings were made in Buddhist temples to the spirits of revered monks.

Important national rituals involving tea drinking were being presided over by the government officials of the "Tabang" department. There is at least one ritual recorded in the Goryeosa Yaeji, or The Official History of Goryeo, mentioned as part of receiving a Chinese messenger to the court.

Joseon dynasty 
During the Joseon Dynasty (1392–1910), the ritualistic drinking of tea continued and was further refined. "Tabang" sustained and organized main royal ceremony. The royal Yi family and the aristocracy used tea for simple rites, the "Day Tea Rite" was a common daytime ceremony, whereas the "Special Tea Rite" was reserved for specific occasions. They were codified in the 1474 "National Five Rites" (Gukjo Oryeui, 國朝五禮儀, 국조오례의). These terms are not found in other countries.

But plantation problems changed many ways Korean tea was governed. Unlike tea plantation areas in China or Japan, the climate of the Korean Peninsula is much colder and Tea harvesting season occurs just before the spring. So at that period, the tea tree forested areas in the mountains were still so cold and also dangerous because of wildlife. The old Korean name of tea, 설록("Seollok", 雪綠), means the first flush tea leaf was harvested on the snow field of a mountain. This situation brought much trouble during the Goryeo Dynasty and Joseon Dynasty.

The tea tree forested area is also the traditional Breadbasket of Korea and the tea leaf harvesting season and cereal seeding season overlap each other. Because of its value, farmers who lived around tea tree forested regions paid a steep tea tax to the King. So harvesting and treating tea leaf is pointed out as the major cause of the decrease in annual tea crop harvest. In the Goryeo Dynasty, there were hundreds of appeals by many lieges and scholars as Lee Je-hyun or Lee Gyu-bo. And finally at the end of the Goryeo Dynasty, recorded in the "Yuduryurok(유두류록, 遊頭流錄)", farmers burnt or chopped their tea trees to protest their tea tax.  In the case of Joseon Dynasty, governed based by Confucianism, Tabang was sustained for tea ceremony but reduced the scale of tea production in order to protect the agricultural balance. Because of this reason,  the development of the tea industry was prevented for a very long time. And except Yangban and the Royal family, Korean original tea drinking culture and ceremony remained in a limited area around tea tree forested regions.

However, by the middle of the Joseon dynasty, there appears to have been a decline in tea drinking except for the ceremony for anniversary. It is said, that when the Ming Commander, Yang Hao, told King Seonjo (r.1567-1601) during the Japanese invasion that he had discovered high-quality tea plants in Korea, and that "if you were to sell the tea in Liaodong, you could get a silver coin for every ten pounds of tea. Altogether, that would be enough silver to buy ten thousand horses." King Seonjo, however, replied "We do not have a tea drinking custom in our country."

Post-Joseon dynasty 
Towards the end of the Joseon Dynasty, commoners joined the trend and used tea for ancestral rites. Mainly Scholars of Silhak, like Jeong Yak-yong, Kim Jeong-hui, had interests in tea "drinking" culture and its production at their exile period on tea forested region. These people corresponded with monks who still had tea drinking culture. It started from Silla and Goryeo Dynasty that monks formed and administrated tea forest around the temple and it passed down as their possession. And Buddhist tea ceremony and drinking culture stylized in the traditional temple. And these two cultural leader group's relationship influenced both Seonbi society and contemporary monks.

Since 1960 
After the Japanese occupation and the Korean War, tea culture in Korea had become rare, scarce, and largely forgotten. In the 1960s, Choe Kilsung was commissioned by the Korean Cultural Heritage Administration to investigate tea culture, and found that several temples were cultivating their own private tea gardens.
In the 1970s, the "Korean Tea Culture Revival Movement" began in Korea.

In 1973 Lee Gwilye began researching the classics, and in 1979 she founded the Korean Tea People's Association.

Equipment

Korean tea ceremonies follow the seasons, and the ceramics and metalware used vary. Religious traditions were influential.
Stoneware was common, earthenware more frequent, mostly made in provincial kilns, with porcelain rare, imperial porcelain with dragons the rarest. Examples of equipment used in this ceremony are also discussed in the general entry Korean Ceramics as well as the more specific Korean pottery with images cited.

Historically the appearance of the bowls and cups is naturalistic, with a division according to religious influence. Celadon or jade green, "punchong" (hangul:분청, hanja:粉靑), or bronze-like weathered patinas for Buddhist tea rituals; the purest of white with faint designs in porcelain for Confucian tea rituals; and coarser porcelains and ash-stone glazes for animist tea rituals, or for export to Japan where they were known as "gohan chawan". An aesthetic of rough surface texture from a clay and sand mix with a thin glazing were particularly prized and copied. The randomness of this creation was said to provide a "now moment of reality" treasured by tea masters.

Glazing has very rich texture and variations between many tones occur that change colour according to light and season. Clay used was generally light, with celadon clays being particularly prized.

Glazing tricks could imitate most materials: from bamboo, through pebbles in rivers, through tree-bark, to human skin, with rare and unique glazes that gave tiger's eye, peach, or snow-like attributes in deep snow-drift glazes or fine etched white porcelain. Thus enhancing memories of seasons, poems, writings, or still moments.

Potting style, glazing, form vary according to date. Old designs are still kept up, and exports to Japan were significant, from the late 16th century onwards. Korean potters such as the Yi Sukkwang (이숙황) and Yi Kyeong (이경), brothers transferred traditional styles abroad that became known as the "Hagi" styles. Individual families of potters and provincial kilns provided highly individual glazes whose depth identifies the best middle Joseon jagi (Joseon wares).

The dimensions exposed a maximum surface area to aid in cooling boiled water. Hot water would be poured into the bowls, allowed to cool a bit, then poured into a teapot. The water was cooled because pouring boiling hot water over tea leaves extracts too much of the bitter taste and results in a bitter tea. With two hands, the tea would be poured into smaller matching cups with covers, placed on a rough wood or lacquer table. The tea was drunk by lifting the cup cover while drinking so as not to show the open mouth. Tea would be taken cool.

Autumn and winter tea equipment consisted of taller narrower bowls, such as the "irabo" style, that would contain and maintain heat. Typically of spiral construction, shallow, with a high rim. Once again tea made within that bowl would then be poured into heated teapots, and poured centered over a smaller matching cup with cover. Tea would be taken hot. And once again repeatedly poured in small spurts from cup to cup so as to prevent flavour concentrated in one cup.

Unlike the Chinese tradition, no Korean tea vessels used in the ceremony are tested for a fine musical note. Judgment instead is based on naturalness in form, emotion, and colouring.

A natural approach to tea

Central to the Korean approach to tea is an easy and natural coherence, with fewer formal rituals, fewer absolutes, greater freedom for relaxation, and more creativity in enjoying a wider variety of teas, services, and conversation.

This leads to a wider variance of teahouse design, tea garden entries and gardens, different use and styles of teawares, and regional variations in choice of tea, choice of cakes and biscuits and snacks, seasonal and temporal variations, and the acoustic and visual ambiance of Korean teahouses.

Tea storage containers were often large – being made of clay coils, finished on potter's wheels, and 3/4 glazed from within the kiln itself as wood burned. Natural green ash glazes were typical. A wood scoop with a long handle often a split bamboo with a scoop end would be used to retrieve the tea.

Generally the best local water is used to make the tea, and at times some of the best Korean teahouses had their own small springs. Water is brought to boil above a wood fire, poured into a teapot and brought immediately to service.

Tea is poured initially by a tea hostess into warmed cups from a heated teapot at a distance above the first cup so as to create a controlled flow of tea with attractive bubbles. This is done to create good luck.

Tea ceremonies have always been used for important occasions such as birthdays, anniversaries, remembrance of old friends, and increasingly a way to rediscovering the joys of Seon meditation.

As Korean tea was often green tea, even small leaves were rare.

One of the modern variations of the Korean tea ceremony involves a low tea table around which the guests and master sit. The tea master or host will sit on one side and will heat and pour and clean the tea ware as part of the whole ceremony from start to finish. The host or master will often keep all the tea ware on the tea table all year, and will cover it with a cloth while not using it. The collection is often made up of several different teapots, often with many different color & shape teacups. The ceremony begins with all the guests sitting around the table and as the water heats the host will begin the conversation, usually with informal or casual questions, such as asking about the guests' family.

The host will start the official ceremony by first heating the pot, cups and decanting bowl with hot water, then after this is complete, will pour the tea leaves – usually green tea – into the pot. Then the host pours hot water onto the leaves and will then pour out the water very quickly, thereby rinsing the leaves of any dust and opening them up slightly. Then, the host will pour the hot water into the decanting bowl and allow it to cool to the correct temperature for the tea they are using. This depends on when the tea is picked; tea picked earlier in the season, such as the first buds picked in early April, will be steeped at lower temperature than tea leaves picked in June. Once the water is at the right temperature, the host will pour the water into the pot and steep it for anywhere from 20 seconds to two to three minutes, depending on the tea. After steeping is complete, the host pours the tea into the decanting bowl, which serves to get the water off the leaves in the pot and also to give the tea an even mixture. Then it is poured into the cups. The guests will wait until the host or master picks up their cup first, then will pick up theirs. This is repeated until they are finished, which sometimes can be several hours later. The whole ceremony is very relaxing and is a wonderful way to get to know someone or to ease into a business transaction.

Kinds of tea

The earliest kinds of tea used in tea ceremonies were heavily pressed cakes of black tea, the equivalent of aged pu-erh tea still popular in China. Vintages of tea were respected, and tea of great age imported from China had a certain popularity at court. However, importation of tea plants by Buddhist monks brought a more delicate series of teas into Korea, and the tea ceremony.

While green tea, "chaksol" or "chugno", is most often served, other teas such as "Byeoksoryung" Chunhachoon, Woojeon, Jakseol, Jookro, Okcheon, as well as native chrysanthemum tea, persimmon leaf tea, or mugwort tea may be served at different times of the year.

Korean teas were divided into the five different tastes: bitterness, sweetness, astringency, saltiness and "sourness". Aging is rare and most teas are consumed as fresh as possible, with particular note to new harvests.

Tea regions were famous for producing teas with characteristic compositions of the five taste elements: Jeju Island, contemporarily, has teas with more salt in them due to ocean winds; other elements are brought out by different means of cooking the leaves, or hardness of water.

Teas also evoke four kinds of thought for Korean Buddhists: peacefulness, respectfulness, purity and quietness. Those teas that bring out more of these qualities are prized.

Kinds of Tea Ceremonies

Buddhist monks incorporated tea ceremonies into votive offerings. However, the Goryeo nobility and later the Confucian yangban scholars formalized the rituals into things of beauty.

There are at least 15 major tea ceremonies that are performed, and they include, they are listed according to age and fame:

 Day Tea Rite - Joseon dynasty daily palace tea ceremony
 Special Tea Rite - Joseon dynasty ceremony welcoming visiting foreigners, trade and tribute missions, and at royal weddings
 Queen Tea Ceremony - a special tea ceremony shown upon occasion in royal Korean soap operas: only for women friends, family and servants of the Queen, but often including the Crown Prince.

Matcha, or powdered green tea, has also enjoyed limited popularity in Korea. Tea leaves ground into very fine powder are traditionally associated with the Japanese Tea Ceremony, but in Korea this form of tea has regained a certain amount of regard, especially with Buddhists. Myeong-san cha, or meditation tea is a form of meditation in and of itself. It is said to have been popular among monks practicing meditation for many days without sleep. Matcha contains more nutritional value than even regular ip-cha, or leaf tea. All of the tea leaf is consumed and it contains higher amounts of vitamin C, tannins and polyphenols.

With the advent of Christianity in Korea, this kind of meditation tea is viewed as Buddhist and is largely ignored by many, based solely on religious beliefs. True da-in, or tea people relish the physical and cerebral benefits of matcha.

Traditional Tea Ceremonies and Modern Restorations

The modern times represent the period of revival and restoration of the traditional Korean tea culture and tea ceremonies in Korea. Of many involved in various traditional cultural efforts, Myung Won, Kim Mi-Hee held the first ever Korean tea culture research and academic conference in 1979, and in the subsequent year of 1980, Myung Won held the first ever public presentation of the comprehensive procedures of traditional Korean tea ceremonies at the Sejong cultural center. The tea ceremonies of the royal court, Buddhist temple tea ceremonies, Guest Greeting tea ceremonies and Everyday tea ceremony were resorted and presented. These traditional Korean tea ceremonies are being carried on today by Myung Won's second daughter, Kim Eui-Jung, who is the proprietor of the Intangible Cultural Asset 27 of Seoul, the Royal Court Tea ceremony.

With the recognition of healthful effects of tea and increasing awareness of traditional culture, there is an increasing awareness of Korean tea culture and practice of tea ceremonies and there are many interest groups in Korea today.

Contemporary revival of Tea Ceremonies at Panyaro Institute

The Panyaro Institute for the Promotion of the Way of Tea was founded to perpetuate the lifelong work of the celebrated Korean Tea Master, the Venerable Hyodang, who devoted sixty years of his life to a study of the teachings of the great Korean spiritual master Wonhyo and to the elaboration of methods of using tea in meditation.

Hyodang contributed to the culture of tea in three major ways: First, he published the first Korean book consecrated to the Way of Tea, "The Korean Way of Tea", a work that continues to inspire readers interested in Korean tea culture. Second, he transmitted the particular method of making the green tea known as Panyaro. 
Third, he founded the first association of Koreans interested in the study of tea, the "Korean Association for the Way of Tea".

Hyodang was also the first to give ordinary readers an
awareness of the significance of the life of the Venerable Ch'o-ui, the early 19th century tea master, through a series of articles published in a popular newspaper. Just as Ch'o-ui led the revival of interest in tea in his time, so Hyodang led the modern revival.

In 1981 Chae Won-hwa launched what became the Panyaro Institute for the Promotion of the Way of Tea, and by November 1995 she had established a formal graduation ceremony for those who had completed the full course of study. Such ceremonies are now held each year.

See also
Korean tea
Culture of Korea
East Asian tea ceremony

References

 Yoo Yang-Seok (Fred) The Book of Korean Tea (Seoul: The Myung Won Cultural Foundation, 2007)

External links
 The Korean Way of Tea EasternTea.com
 Tea Culture Exhibition Amore Pacific Museum
 Hadong Mountain Dew Tea Festival, May 19–22 annually
 Myung Won Cultural Foundation English Pages Korean Tea Ceremonies
Korean Tea Ceremony Encyclopedia 

Korean tea culture
Korean traditions